Sheekhaal Gendershe (Somali: Benadiri Gendershe Arabic:شيخال جندرشه) also known as Reer Aw Garweyne are a Benadiri clan, mainly from the southern coastal towns of Gendershe, Marka and Mogadishu. The Gendershe have also established communities in the hinterlands in towns such as Afgooye and the villages surrounding it due to trading and farming.

Overview 
The Reer Aw Garweyne, who are more commonly known as Sheekhaal Gendershe get their name from the town in which their patriarch first settled in (Gendershe). The tomb of their ancestor Aw Cusmaan Garweyne (big beard) is also buried in this village synonymous with this clan and it's destination of siyaaro (pilgrimages) to venerate their ancestor Aw Cismaan.

Aw Garweyne

Gendershe sub-clans 

 Maad-Sheekh
 Reer Aw-Ibraahim
 Reer Izgoowe
 Reer Aw-Muraaf
 Naakhude
 Gaameedle
 Mahri

Descendants

Notable people 

 Maxamed Sheekh Jamaal Cabdulaahi, Mayor of Mogadishu from 1956 to 1960 and the first Somali mayor of the city.
 Ugaas Cabdulqaadir Xussen - President of Sheekhaal Gendershe Clan
 Maxamed Xusseen Cali (Shiiqaalow) - Somali National Football Player
 Cabduraxmaan Sheekh Maxamed (Aw Koombe) - Comedian
 Jaarlees Cadde - Comedian
 Sheekh Maxamed Sh. Cabduraxmaan Abba Xaaji - First Teacher at Somali Youth League school
 Sheekh Cusmaan Sheekh Cabdiqaadir - First Somali Pilot
 Maxamed Sheekh Aanis - Somali Singer
 Amiinullaahi Maxamed Sh. Jamaal - First Translator for the Federal Parliament of Somalia
 Sheekh Muxyidiin Sheekh Maxamed Sheekh Isaaq Al Gendershi - Qadi of Mogadishu
 Maxamed Sheekh Cabdi Sheekh Cusmaan - Member of Federal Parliament of Somalia

References 

Somali clans